Kim Se-jung (born April 7, 1986), better known by her stage name Ban Se-jung, is a South Korean actress. She is known for her role as Jang Se-ryung on the series Love on a Rooftop.

Filmography

Film

Television

References

External links

1986 births
Living people
South Korean film actresses
South Korean television actresses
South Korean stage actresses